Neeraj Dangi is an Indian politician from Rajasthan. He was elected to the Rajya Sabha, upper house of the Parliament of India from Rajasthan in the June 2020 Rajya sabha elections as an Indian National Congress candidate.

Neeraj Dangi is son of Late Dinesh Dangi, ex-Minister of State (Rajasthan).

Political life 
He has been associated with Congress for the last 25 years.  At present, he is a General Secretary of Rajasthan Pradesh Congress Committee. He is well known for his strong eloquent speaking ability, intelligence, and abilities to mobilize public, colleagues and subordinates. He has a healthy relationship with the majority of the key leaders in the state.

Despite having lost the Assembly elections by a negligible margin, Neeraj Dangi put continuous hard work in developing region of his constituency. As a result, developmental works of more than 4 billion were performed during Congress government in five years i.e. 2008–2013.

Neeraj Dangi belongs to Meghwal community.

Neeraj Dangi, completed his degree in Civil Engineering from National Institute of Technology Karnataka.

Personal life 
Neeraj Dangi was born on 4 February 1970 to Dinesh Dangi and Briju Devi Dangi in Jaipur, Rajasthan.

Present Post 

 Member of Parliament (Rajya Sabha) from Rajasthan – Elected on 19 June 2020 (Congress candidature declared by AICC on 12 March 2020; Nomination filed on 13 March 2020 (Elections are to be conducted on 26 March 2020, but deferred due to Nationwide lockdown because of Covid-19)
 General Secretary, PCC, Rajasthan – appointed on 29 November 2014
 AICC Member – appointed on 15 March 2018
 In-charge General Secretary, PCC for Rajsamand District – appointed on 24 April 2016
 Elected Member, PCC, Rajasthan from Mt. Abu, Distt. Sirohi – since 9 October 2017
 Advisor, Divisional Advisory Council of SC department of Rajasthan PCC for Jodhpur Division – appointed on 30 March 2016

Previously held posts 

 AICC Observer for Maharashtra Assembly Elections 2019 for Vile Parle (167) Assembly segment, Mumbai  – in Oct. 2019
 Member, Campaign Committee Rajasthan for Loksabha Elections 2019 – appointed by AICC on 4 February 2019
 Congress Candidate, Reodar-148 (S.C.) Assembly Constituency Distt. Sirohi, Rajasthan (15th Assembly Elections-2018)
 Convenor, Protocol Committee for Rajasthan Assembly Elections 2018 – appointed by AICC on 4 October 2018
 Spokesperson, PCC for Rajasthan Assembly Elections 2018 – appointed by AICC on 4 October 2018
 Member, Campaign Committee for Rajasthan Assembly Elections 2018 – appointed by AICC on 4 October 2018
 AICC Zila Mitra (Co-ordinator) for District Udaipur City – appointed on 23 July 2017
 AICC Observer for Gujarat Assembly Elections 2017 for Himatnagar (27) Assembly segment  – in Nov.-Dec. 2017
 Elected Member, PCC, Rajasthan from Reodar, Distt. Sirohi – from Oct. 2010 to 9 October 2017
 AICC Observer for UP Assembly Elections 2017 for Kanpur Cantt. (216) Assembly segment  – in Feb. 2017 (Congress won this seat out of total 7 seats by a margin of 9710 votes)
 AICC Observer for Punjab Assembly Elections 2017 for District Faridkot for three Assembly segments – Faridkot (87), Kot Kapura (88)  & Jaitu (89) – in Jan.-Feb. 2017
 AICC Observer for Punjab for District Faridkot for demonetization programme – in Jan 2017
 Facilitator U.P. for Barabanki, Faizabad, Ambedkar Nagar & Basti districts for 2017 assembly elections – appointed on 13 August 2015 by AICC.
 In-charge General Secretary, PCC for Jalore District – from 21 December 2014 to 24 April 2016

 Observer, PCC for Panchayati Raj Elections Jan.-Feb. 2015 for Pratapgarh District
 General Secretary, PCC, Rajasthan – from 3 October 2011 to 27 November 2014
 Incharge General Secretary, Communication Department, PCC, Rajasthan – from 13 August 2013 to 27 November 2014 
 Spokesperson, PCC, Rajasthan – from 27 November 2011 to 27 November 2014
 In-charge General Secretary, PCC for Banswara & Dungarpur Districts and PYC – from 17 October 2011 to 27 November 2014
 Observer, PCC for Congress Sandesh Yatra 2013 for Udaipur Division
 President, Rajasthan Pradesh Youth Congress – from 24 February 2004 to 13 January 2009
 In-charge Western U.P. for Indian Youth Congress Membership Drive – Feb/Mar 2011
 AICC Member – from Feb 2004 to Oct 2010
 Congress Candidate, Reodar-148 (S.C.) Assembly Constituency Distt. Sirohi, Rajasthan (13th Assembly Elections-2008) – Lost by 3,238 votes only.
 Congress Candidate, Desuri-163 (S.C.) Assembly Constituency Distt. Pali, Rajasthan (12th Assembly Elections-2003) – Lost by 633 votes only.
 AICC Observer for Bihar Assembly Elections 2010 for two Assembly segments – Kusheshwar Asthan (78) & Gaura Bauram (79) – in Oct 2010
 Member, the General Body of Dr. Ambedkar Foundation, Ministry of Social Justice & Empowerment, Govt. of India (Appointed on 2 February 2010)
 Member, Dr. Ambedkar Samajik Samata Kendra Yojana Scheme under Dr. Ambedkar Foundation (Appointed on 29 September 2011)
 Member, Delhi Advisory Panel, Central Board of Film Certification, Ministry of Information & Broadcasting, Govt. of India – from 30 October 2006 to Oct 2010.
 PCC Observer for Jalore local bodies elections – Nov 2009
 Member, Congress Youth Brigade, appointed by AICC in Jan 2004 for Lok Sabha Elections 2004.
 AICC Observer for Mehrauli District in MCD elections 2007.
 IYC Observer for U.P. Assembly elections 2007.
 District President for Pali (Rural) of "Sadbhavna Ke Sipahi" Abhiyan appointed on 22 September 2003 by Shri Sunil Dutt.
 Member, District Programme Implementation Committee, Pali, Govt. of Rajasthan – from 1999 to Dec 2003.
 Vice President, Raj. Pradesh Youth Congress – from 26 April 1998 to Feb 2002.
 Elected Member, PCC from Desuri Block, Distt. Pali – from 21 May 1997 to Nov 1999.
 Observer, Youth Congress for Distt. Sirohi for the Youth Congress Membership drive – 2001
 Joint Secretary, Raj. Pradesh Youth Congress – from Jan 1998 to Apr 1998.
 Organization Secretary, Raj. Pradesh Youth Congress – from Jan 1996 to Jan 1998.
 Observer, Youth Congress for Jodhpur City, Jodhpur Rural, Sirohi Distt., Rajsamand Distt. & Udaipur City – at several times.
 Co-Convener for Distt. Pali for ‘Sandesh Yatra’, a state-wide programme organized by PCC – from 15 July 1997 to 18 July 1997.
 Observer, Youth Congress for Distt. Sirohi for ‘Sandesh Yatra’ – from 29 October 1996 to 4 November 1996.

Special work allotted by AICC, New Delhi 

 Appointed as an Observer AICC for Amethi block of Amethi Assembly segment of Amethi Loksabha Constituency for Loksabha Elections 2014 from 21 April 2014 to 7 May 2014.
 Appointed LRO (Loksabha Returning Officer) for AICC PRIMARIES Loksabha Elections 2014 for Mandsour Loksabha constituency (Madhya Pradesh) from 18 February 2014 to 4 March 2014 (worked independently as LRO)
 Appointed ARO for AICC PRIMARIES Loksabha Elections 2014 for North Kolkata Loksabha constituency from 30 January 2014 to 7 February 2014
 Was appointed as an Observer AICC by Smt. Sonia Gandhi ji to support the Tsunami victims’ families and for observation and necessary action to be taken for post Tsunami relief work at Andaman & Nicobar Islands – from 9 February 2005 to 22 February 2005. The ten members committee included Dr. Sanjay Singh, Ex-M.P. from Amethi, Sh. Avinash Pande, Ex-M.P. & GS AICC, Sh. R.C. Kunthia, Ex- M.P. & Secretary AICC along with some other AICC and IYC office bearers.

Countries visited 
United States of America,
Venezuela (South America),
Vietnam,
Indonesia,
China,
Thailand,
Singapore,
Malaysia,
Nepal

Significant activities and programmes 

 Organized Youth Congress Worker's training camps in the State during the last four years and gave political and social training to the youths. During the training camps, the workers were also given social work such as cleaning of streets and public parks, labour work at dams and other places, etc.
 Worked as President Pali district Sadbhavna Ke Sipahi Abhiyan with Late Sh. Sunil Dutt, Ex. M.P. & famous film star who was the National President for Sadbhavna Ke Sipahi Abhiyan. This abhiyan was founded by Smt. Sonia Gandhi ji and its motto is to work among common people to bring in peace & harmony in the Country.
 Was selected as member of the youth Delegation by Indian Youth Congress to participate in the 16th World Youth Festival at Caracas, Venezuela (South America) from 8 – 19 Aug 2005. The World Youth Conference was organized to maintain peace in the world. It was against terrorism, capitalism & imperialism.
 Rajsthan Pradesh Youth Congress under Neeraj Dangi's presidentship had organized many blood donation camps in Rajasthan on various occasions including 21 May- the death anniversary of Shri Rajiv Gandhi ji, 31 Oct – the death anniversary of Smt. Indira Gandhi ji, 3 May – Birth day of Shri Ashok Gehlot, C.M. of Rajasthan, etc. Thousands of blood units were donated by the youth workers during these camps to save the lives of needy.

 Rajsthan Pradesh Youth Congress under Neeraj Dangi's presidentship had organized various free medical camps for the poor, especially, in the rural areas of the State during 2004–2008. Also, for the sake of Environment, tree plantation programmes were regularly organized throughout the State.
 Organized hundreds of agitation programmes to raise the various public issues of the state viz. electricity problem, drinking water, security of women, poor & downtrodden people, excise policy of the Government, law and order situation in the state, relief work in the rural areas during draught, proper salary to the labour working under National Rural Employment Guarantee Scheme of Central Government, Dalit atrocities etc. Among these programmes were two major state-level demonstrations outside Rajasthan Vidhan Sabha on 11 April 2005 and 18 September 2007. Around 15 to 20 thousand Youth Congress workers all over Rajasthan gathered at Jaipur and raised voice for the various public issues of the state.
 In Jan 2005, Rajasthan Pradesh Youth Congress under Neeraj Dangi's presidentship contributed Rs. 3,37,120/- to ‘Rajiv Gandhi National Relief & Welfare Trust’ for Tsunami affected people. In Dec 2005, contributed Rs. 3,86,417/- to ‘Rajiv Gandhi National Relief & Welfare Trust’ for J & K earth quake affected people. In the year 2007, contributed Rs. 2,36,361/- to ‘Rajiv Gandhi National Relief & Welfare Trust’ for flood affected people of Barmer, Rajasthan.
 Member ‘Mahavir International’ Pali Distt.
 In Desuri Constituency, organized a Free Eye Operation Camp along with T.B. & Dental Diseases Camp in memory of Late Shri Dinesh Dangi, Ex-Minister, Rajasthan – from 1 March 1997 to 6 March 1997.

References

External links
 Neeraj Dangi profile on RPCC
 Neeraj Dangi Facebook official page 
 Neeraj Dangi Twitter Handle
 Neeraj Dangi on myneta.info
 Rajya Sabha elections 2020: Congress' KC Venugopal, Neeraj Dangi; BJP's Rajendra Gehlot win in Rajasthan
 Congress wins two seats in high-profile Rajasthan Rajya Sabha polls

Living people
People from Rajasthan
Indian National Congress politicians
Rajya Sabha members from Rajasthan
1970 births